Cedarville School is a historic school building located at Cedarville, Gilmer County, West Virginia. It was built in 1923, and is a two-story "T"-shaped, wood-frame building with a hipped roof, measuring approximately 50 feet deep and 80 feet wide. It has striated stuccoed exterior surfaces and is on a raised basement of locally quarried stone.  It was used as a school until 1968, after which it was converted to apartments.

It was listed on the National Register of Historic Places in 1994.

References

American Craftsman architecture in West Virginia
American Foursquare architecture in West Virginia
Apartment buildings in West Virginia
Bungalow architecture in West Virginia
Defunct schools in West Virginia
Educational institutions disestablished in 1968
Educational institutions established in 1923
Former school buildings in the United States
National Register of Historic Places in Gilmer County, West Virginia
1923 establishments in West Virginia
School buildings on the National Register of Historic Places in West Virginia
1968 disestablishments in West Virginia